The Varginha UFO incident involves a series of events in 1996 when residents of Varginha, Brazil claimed seeing one or more strange creatures and at least one unidentified flying object (UFO). Other associated claims include the capture of one or more extraterrestrial beings by the Brazilian authorities, animal fatalities at a zoo, and a woman impregnated by an extraterrestrial. The reports have garnered extensive media coverage.

Overview
According to media reports, a creature was sighted on the afternoon of January 20, 1996, by three women ranging from 14 to 22 years old. The women described the creature as a large headed biped with "spots like veins on the skin and some bumps on the head [...] eyes were two red balls." The creature (later termed the "ET de Varginha") seemed to be wobbly or unsteady, and the girls assumed it was injured or sick. The women said that they fled and told their mother that they had seen the "devil".

Rumors afterward began to spread through the area, with some people claiming to have observed UFOs in the days prior. Later, claims were made of additional unidentified creatures/extraterrestrials being collected and observed at a hospital, military/police/government trucks and personnel being active in the area, an unidentified animal "prowling" a local forest, the death of a police officer, and unexplained animal deaths occurring in the local zoo. Ufologists would later allege links between these and other claims, including the claim that one of the initial creature witnesses was impregnated by the creature.

Inquiry
An official inquiry led by the Brazilian military concluded in 2010 that the young women had encountered a homeless, mentally unstable man nicknamed "Mudinho." The Commander of 24th Police Battalion Military "presented photographs (...) a citizen known as Mudinho, who probably has some mental disability and whose physical characteristics matched the description (...) make it likely that the hypothesis that this citizen, probably being dirty, due to the heavy rains and seen crouching by a wall, was mistaken by the three terrified girls as a space creature." The head of the official inquiry reported that the military trucks and personnel were performing routine duties on the night they were observed, stating, "the presence of the Firefighters in Jardim Andere, the parking of Army trucks in the vicinity of the concessionaire where their periodic maintenance would be carried out ... and the departure of EsSA vehicles ... were real facts ... incorrectly interpreted as Firefighters and the Military participating in the capture and later the transport of the alleged creature to Campinas."

The Brazilian authorities also reported that the aliens allegedly seen in a hospital were actually an expectant couple who had dwarfism.

Skeptic Brian Dunning criticized sensational media accounts and UFOlogists claims. According to Dunning, "It is the most compelling example of a case where literally nothing at all happened that was remotely unusual, and was magnified into a case considered unassailable proof of alien visitation by many. To those believers, I would suggest recalibrating where you set the bar for quality of evidence"."

Notoriety
These claims have markedly effected tourism to the city of Varginha. Grey alien dolls with football uniforms are sold at the location of the incident. Grey alien designs were used in advertising campaigns for the municipality. Bus stops were built in the form of spaceships and a 20 metres tall water tower with a disc-shaped water reservoir was erected in the town center called the Nave Espacial de Varginha. 

The Brazilian government denied conspiracy theorists claims that it was hiding evidence of extraterrestrials. 

In April 2020, a mask was placed on one of the public monuments of Varginha aliens, a stunt made as part of a COVID-19 public health campaign.

Media
"1996"''', a 2020 film by director Rodrigo Brandão, revisits the event in a horror story made along the lines of a documentary (in the style of The Blair Witch Project). The short was made in VHS and follows the trajectory of two teenagers who are going to the city of Varginha on 20 January 1996. They end up getting lost in the woods at night and are found by the ET. The short was well received and participated in several important festivals such as the 23rd Tiradentes Cinema Exhibition. 
 UFO Files S1 E4: The Brazilian UFO Crash: The Truth , was broadcast on July 23, 2011 on Syfy. Incidente em Varginha, a video game inspired by these events.

 See also 
 UFO sightings in Brazil

 References 

 External links 
 Caso ET de Varginha (Mais Varginha)  
 Revista UFO (UFO Magazine), Special Issue #13, July 1996, published by CBPDV (Centro Brasileiro para Pesquisa de Discos Voadores - Brazilian Center for Flying Saucer Research), Editor Ademar José Gevaerd  English translation
 Revista UFO (UFO Magazine''), Web Site Varginha Incident 

1996 in Brazil
January 1996 events in South America
History of Minas Gerais
Mass psychogenic illness
UFO sightings in Brazil